Martina Šurnovská (born 10 February 1999) is a Slovak footballer who currently plays as a midfielder for Czech First Division club Slavia Prague and the Slovakia women's national team.

Career
Šurnovská has been capped for the Slovakia national team, appearing for the team during the 2019 FIFA Women's World Cup qualifying cycle.

International goals
Scores and results list Finland's goal tally first.

References

External links
 
 
 

1999 births
Living people
Slovak women's footballers
Slovakia women's international footballers
Women's association football midfielders
Apollon Ladies F.C. players
Expatriate women's footballers in Cyprus
Slovak expatriate sportspeople in Cyprus
ŠK Slovan Bratislava (women) players
Footballers at the 2014 Summer Youth Olympics
SK Slavia Praha (women) players
Expatriate women's footballers in the Czech Republic
Slovak expatriate sportspeople in the Czech Republic
Czech Women's First League players